Pultenaea bracteaminor is a species of flowering plant in the family Fabaceae and is endemic to Queensland. It is an erect shrub with cylindrical leaves and yellow to orange and red flowers.

Description

Taxonomy and naming
Pultenaea bracteaminor was first formally described in 2004 by Rogier Petrus Johannes de Kok in Australian Systematic Botany from specimens collected near Jandowae by Bob Coveny. The specific epithet (bracteaminor) refers to the bracts that are scale-like and much smaller than those of P. bracteamajor.

Distribution and habitat
This pultenaea grows in woodland and forest in the Burnett and Darling Downs regions of south-eastern Queensland.

References

bracteaminor
Flora of Queensland
Plants described in 2004